Reijo Jalava (18 February 1932 – 25 January 2001) was a Finnish footballer. He played in 18 matches for the Finland national football team from 1956 to 1961.

References

1932 births
2001 deaths
Finnish footballers
Finland international footballers
Place of birth missing
Association footballers not categorized by position